Tyagraj Paramasiva Iyer Kailasam (Kannada: ತ್ಯಾಗರಾಜ ಪರಮಶಿವ ಐಯ್ಯರ್ ಕೈಲಾಸಂ, 1884–1946), was an Indian playwright and prominent writer in the Kannada literature. Literary criticism in Kannada literature is said to have started for the first time by Kailasam in his works.

His contribution to Kannada theatrical comedy earned him the title Prahasana Prapitamaha (ಪ್ರಹಸನ ಪ್ರಪಿತಾಮಹ; the great-grandfather of humorous plays). He was later often revered "the one and only Kailasam for Kannada" (ಕನ್ನಡಕ್ಕೆ ಒಬ್ಬನೇ ಕೈಲಾಸಂ).

Life

Kailasam was born in a Tamil Iyer brahmin family in Mysore, Kingdom of Mysore (now Karnataka). He belonged to the Mangudi Brahacharanam subsect. His father, T Paramasiva Iyer, was a revenue collector in the Government of Mysore who later became the Chief Justice of Mysore High Court. His father's brother, Sir T. Sadasiva Iyer, was a Chief Justice of Travancore High Court. Sir C.V. Raman is his father's cousin on the parental side.

Kailasam received a good education. He was supported by Maharaja Krishnaraja Wadiyar IV to study geology at the Royal College of Science, London. His close friends and classmates included K. V. Iyer and V. Seetharamaiah. Kailasam repeated several courses to have an excuse to extend his stay in England. He spent seven years in school there to complete his fellowship, participating in theatre whenever possible.

Soon after his return, he joined the geology service in Mysore government. He became disillusioned with a government job and quit to write plays and live a bohemian life. His father's failed ambitious plan that he would become the Director General of the Department of Geology led him to stop talking to him.

Playwright 
Kailasam's life was dedicated to local theatre and his contributions revolutionised it. His humour left an impression on Kannadigas. He opposed the company theatre's obsession with mythology and stories of royalty and shied away from loading his plays with music. Instead, he introduced simple, realistic sets. Kailasam chaired the Kannada Sahitya Sammelana held at Madras in 1945. A chainsmoker, he spent almost ten years at an apartment in Chamarajapuram which he called "Nook". Reputedly a notoriously filthy place, he loved it and wrote many dramas in there. He dictated his stories to his students at the Nook, usually starting after 10pm.

Kailasam was initially criticised for modern use of the Kannada language in his plays at a time when the language was used under strict linguistic syntax and semantics. But soon after, his works became very popular and are considered among the best in Kannada theatre, known for wit and satirical commentary on society.

Plays

Kannada
 ToLLu Gatti or MakkaLiskool Manelalwe? [ಟೊಳ್ಳು ಗಟ್ಟಿ]
 Poli Kitti, The Story of a born scout [ಪೋಲಿ ಕಿಟ್ಟಿ]
 Bahishkara [ಬಹಿಷ್ಕಾರ]
 HomeRoolu [ಹೋ೦ರೂಲು ]
 Gandaskatri [ಗಂಡಸ್ಕತ್ರಿ]
 Vaidyana Vyadhi [ವೈದ್ಯನ ವ್ಯಾಧಿ]
 TaLikattokkooline? [ತಾಳಿಕಟ್ಟೋಕ್ಕೂಲಿನೇ]
 Huttadalli Hutta (Waels Within Weals) [ಹುತ್ತದಲ್ಲಿ ಹುತ್ತ]
 BandvaLvillada Badayi [ಬಂಡ್ವಾಳ್ವಿಲ್ಲದ ಬಡಾಯಿ]
 Ammavra Ganda [ಅಮ್ಮಾವ್ರ ಗಂಡ ]
 Seekarne Saavitri [ಸೀಕರ್ಣೆ ಸಾವಿತ್ರಿ]
 Sattavana Santhaapa [ಸತ್ತವನ ಸಂತಾಪ]
 AnukoolakkobaNNa [ಅನುಕೂಲಕ್ಕೊಬ್ಬಣ್ಣ]
 Namkampni [ನಮ್ ಕಂಪನಿ]
 NamkLabbu [ನಮ್ಕ್ಳಬ್ಬು]
 NammBramhaNkay [ನಮ್ಮ್ ಬ್ರಾಹ್ಮಣ್ಕೆ]
 SooLe (Murder O' Mercy) [ಸೂಳೆ]

English
 Fulfilment
 Purpose
 The Brahmin's Curse
 Simply Kailawesome (film)

References

External links
 Kailasam's English Poems and Plays
 Commemorative Article on Hindu
 Song: Tipparalli Balu Doora on Youtube

1884 births
1946 deaths
Kannada-language writers
Kannada dramatists and playwrights
Writers from Mysore
Indian male dramatists and playwrights
20th-century Indian dramatists and playwrights
Dramatists and playwrights from Karnataka
20th-century Indian male writers